The wildlife of Mongolia consists of unique flora and fauna in 3092.75 habitats dictated by the diverse and harsh climatic conditions found in the country. Then the north, salty marshes, fresh-water sources, desert steppes at the centre, and semi deserts, as well as the hot Gobi desert in the south, the fifth largest desert in the world.

About 90% of this landlocked country is covered by deserts or pastures with extreme climatic conditions. Fauna reported in the wild consists of 139 mammal species, 448 species of birds (including 331 migratory and 119 resident birds), 76 species of fish, 22 reptile species, and six species of amphibians. Grass land and shrubland covers 55 percent of the country, forest covers only 6 percent  in the steppe zone, 36 percent is covered by desert vegetation, and only 1 percent is used for human habitation and agricultural purposes, such as growing crops. The floral vegetation in the Eastern Steppe temperate consists of grassland (the largest of its type in the world).

Geography

Topography
The country is bounded by many zoogeographic regions bordering Tibet, Afghano-Turkistan, Siberia, and the North-Chinese-Manchurian. This has resulted in a faunal richness that combines the species from each of the border nations. Habitat distribution consists of grassland and shrubland and treeland in an area of 55 percent of the country, while forest cover is only 98 percent in the steppe zone, 36 percent is covered by desert vegetation.

Water resources

The drainage pattern in the country is dictated by the continental divide. This separates areas that drain north to the Arctic Ocean from those that drain northeast into the Pacific Ocean. The Khangai Mountains form another divide between areas that drain into the oceans and those that drain inland. In the western and southern zones, streams flow seasonally into salt water lakes without outlets. Rivers of the northern region are perennial, rising from the mountains. The two major river systems are the Orkhon River (Mongolia's longest inland river within the country, which joins the Selenge River) and the Selenge River (Selenga in Russian). Lakes in the country are mostly saline. The largest by volume is freshwater Lake Khövsgöl, a natural lake formed in a structural depression. It is the second oldest lake in the world and accounts for 65 percent of the fresh water of Mongolia (2 percent of that in the world).

Climate
The climate patterns are: Continental climate with very cold conditions (anticyclones are formed here over Siberia) to cool to hot summers in the deserts and semi deserts.

Precipitation
Rainfall and snow are also very uneven, dependent on elevation and latitude. The number of days the sky remains clear and sunny is between 220 and 260 days annually. Snow occurs in the mountain regions in the form of "fierce blizzards" that also cover the steppes. During this period a thin layer of snow totally stops grazing by animals in these pastures.

Legal protection
Commercial exploitation increased between the seventeenth and twentieth centuries, necessitating increased legislation. Two laws were enacted in 1995, the Mongolian Law on Environmental Protection and the Mongolian Law on Hunting.

Protected areas

Immediately after Mongolia attained independence in 1990, the enthusiasm was to declare 100 percent of the area of the country as a national park. However, the figure was pegged at an achievable 30 percent. But due to economic conditions dictating development of mines, the achievement so far has been of the order of 13.8 percent covering an area of  spread over 60 protected areas. There are four categories of protected areas, and these are: Strictly Protected Areas (prohibiting hunting, logging and development with no human habitation as the defined areas are very fragile eco regions); the National Parks, with their historical and educational interest providing for ecotourism in identified areas and with limited access to the local nomads for fishing and grazing; Natural and Historic Monuments with restricted developmental activities; and Nature Reserves though of less important regions addressed issues of providing protection to endangered and rare species of flora and fauna and archeological value with limited access for development within prescribed guidelines.
They are all biosphere reserves under the Man and the Biosphere Programme.

Apart from the above Biosphere reserves, some of the other protected areas under the above four categories are the following.
Strictly Protected Areas

 Khasagt Khayrkhan
 Khukh Serkhiin Nuruu
 Khan Khentii Uul
 Otgon Tenger Reserve
 Numrug
 Mongol Daguur
National Parks

 Gobiin Gurvan Saykhan (2171737 ha)
 Khovsgul Nuur
 Khorgo Terkh Zagaan Nuur
 Gorkhi Terelj
 Altai Tavan Bogd National Park
 Tsambagarav Uul National Park
 Khustain Nuruu National Park
 Lake Khövsgöl National Park
 Southern Altai Gobi National Park
National Reserves
 Ugtam Uul
 Lkhachinvandad Uul
 Bulgan Gol
 Sharga and Mankhan
 Khustain Nuruu
 Nagalkhan Uul
 Batkhan Uul
 Gun-Galuut Nature Reserve
National Monuments
 Eej Khairkhan
 Bulgan Uul
 Togoo Tulga Uul
 Naiman Nuur
 Ganga Nuur

Flora

The flora in the wildlife area of Mongolia is of pasture lands in three-fourths of the country, which is the main source of feed for the large stock of livestock in the country. Forests and barren deserts cover the remaining area in the country. Specifically there are four vegetation zones. Coniferous forest form the taiga region of the northern areas with alpine noted at higher zones. In the mountain forest-steppe zone vegetation is dense on the northern slopes; Siberian larches (grows up to  height), Siberian cedars, interspersed with spruces, pines (Siberian and Scotch pines), and firs along with deciduous vegetation of white and brown birches, aspens, and poplars are noted to dominate the area. The inter-montane basins, wide river valleys and the southern slopes of the mountains have steppe vegetation. Pastureland have a cover of feather grass, couch grass, wormwood, and several species fodder plants. In the semi desert and Gobi desert areas, the vegetation is scanty but just adequate for the camels, sheep and goat populations to feed on and survive. Saxaul (xerophytic) a drought-tolerant species is also noted and it provides for the firewood requirements of the people. Elms and poplars are also found near springs and underground water resources. Saxaul shrubs dominate the deserts and they anchor the sand dunes and prevent erosion. It grows to height of 4 m, over a period of 100 years, with very dense wood that sinks in water. Rhododendrons bloom with red, yellow and white wild flowers and edelweiss is also reported. More than 200 plant species are reported as under threat.

Fauna
There are 139 mammal species found in Mongolia, and 448 species of birds.

Mammals 

Mongolia has a number of large mammals, including gray wolves and  Siberian ibex (Capra sibirica), as well as more endangered species such as the wild Bactrian camel (Camelus ferus), the snow leopard (Uncia uncia), the Gobi bear, (rarest and unique to the desert region), the takhi (both wild and domestic types of horses) and the Asiatic wild ass (the largest numbers in the world are found in the Gobi desert).

The saiga antelope, once a common species, has been reduced by pressures including hunting, livestock grazing, and high Chinese medicinal value, with the Mongolian subspecies reaching a critically endangered level, with fewer than 5,000 individuals left in the wild. The wild horse, in particular, had almost become extinct (not seen for more than three decades) and was therefore reintroduced from captive sources. Other species of mammals reported include: argali (Ovis ammon) (in the rocky mountains of the Gobi desert), common wolf, Mongolian saiga (Saiga tatarica mongolica), musk deer (Moschus moschiferus), Pallas's cat (Felis manul) or manul, black tailed gazelle (Gazelle subgutturosa), stone martin (Martes foina), and wild cats in the Altai ecoregion; wild boar (Sus scrofa nigipes), red deer (Cervus elaphus), roe deer in the forest areas and muskrat, red fox, steppe fox, and sable in the forest and steppe margin areas.

Under the WWW-Mongolia conservation programme (a four-year project), snow leopards, Altai argali sheep and saiga antelope and gazelle of eastern Mongolia are receiving special attention. The Zoological Society of London has taken interest to conserve Bactrian camel, long-eared jerboa (Euchoreutes naso), Mongolian gerbil ("meriones unguiculatus") and saiga antelope.

Birds

The bird species in Mongolia include several that are very large; six species of cranes present account for half the numbers in the world. There are 22 endangered species of birds including hawks, falcons, buzzards, cranes and owls. Though cranes are not hunted for superstitious reasons, they are still threatened due to habitat degradation and only 5000 breeding pairs are reported, mostly in Dornod's Mongol Duguur Strictly Protected Area. In eastern Mongolia, a critically endangered species of crane is the white naped crane (Tsen togoru). Overall there are 469 species of birds, including domesticated species linked to wild ancestral species. Of these, 330 species are migratory and 119 are seen in Mongolia throughout the year. Species identified include: golden eagle (Aquila chrysaetos), lammergeyer (Gypaetus barbatus), spoonbills (Platalea leucorodia), Dalmatian pelican (Pelecanus crispus), great white egrets (Egretta alba), whooper swans (Cygnus cygnus), great black-headed gulls (Larus ichthyaetus), black storks (Ciconia nigra), swan goose (Anser cygnoides) and snowcock (Tetraogallus altaicus) or Altain ular.

Aquatic life

The rivers and lakes of Mongolia are reported to have 76 species of fish, including trout, grayling (the Arctic grayling and the Mongolian grayling can be widely found in Mongolian rivers), roach, lenok, Siberian sturgeon, pike, perch, Altai osman (endemic to the rivers of Mongolia) and the taimen (a huge Siberian salmon relative, growing up to 1.5 m in length and 50 kg in weight).

Threats and conservation

In a country where Russia was supporting the economy with grants until it became independent in 1990, the situation drastically changed after independence. The country's revenue resources then depended more from the wildlife resources and its landscape, which were subject to serious exploitation necessitating a policy change towards ecotourism to generate revenue to preserve the remaining biodiversity of the country.
Other than official action to raise resources of the state, other major threats faced are illegal hunting (for musk deer, elk, boars, squirrels and marmot for illegal trade), grazing of pasture livestock and related needs of water resources (due to large increase in livestock population since 1990), climate change, fires in steppe and forests (resulting in death of many animal species) and severe weather conditions of winter and drought condition.

For conservation of the rich biodiversity of the country Government of Mongolia has established national parks and nature reserves supplemented with laws on hunting regulations and other conservationist measures, and also on hunting and fishing for sport and for commercial purposes.

References

Bibliography
 

Biota of Mongolia
Mongolia